Chronological list of French language authors (regardless of nationality), by date of birth.  For an alphabetical list of writers of French nationality (broken down by genre), see French writers category.

Middle Ages

 Turold (eleventh century)
 Wace (1110 – c.1180)
 Chrétien de Troyes (c.1135 – c.1183)
 Richard the Lionheart (Richard Coeur de Lion) (1157–1199)
 Benoît de Sainte-Maure (12th-century)
 Herman de Valenciennes (12th-century)
 Le Châtelain de Couci (d.1203)
 Jean Bodel (12th century – c.1210)
 Conon de Béthune (c.1150–1220)
 Geoffroi de Villehardouin (c.1160 – c.1213)
 Béroul (c.1170)
 Thomas d'Angleterre (c.1170)
 Aimeric de Peguilhan (c.1170 -c. 1230)
 Gace Brulé (c.1170)
 Marie de France (c.1175)
 Gautier de Coincy (1177/8–1236)
 Gautier de Dargies (c.1170–after 1236)
 Gautier d'Espinal († before July 1272)
 Gillebert de Berneville (fl c.1255)
 Gontier de Soignies (fl c.1180–1220)
 Guiot de Dijon (fl c.1200–30)
 Perrin d'Angicourt (fl c.1245–50)
 Jean Renart (fl. late 12th-first half of 13th century)
 Philippe de Rémi (c.1205–c1265)
 Philippe de Beaumanoir (c.1247–c1296)
 Raoul de Soissons (c.1215–1272)
 Richard de Fournival (1201– c.1260)
 Andrieu Contredit d'Arras († c.1248)
 Jehan le Cuvelier d'Arras (fl c.1240–70)
 Guillaume le Vinier (fl c.1220–45; †1245)
 Audefroi le Bâtard (fl c.1200–1230)
 Jehan Bretel (c.1200–1272)
 Jehan Erart († c.1259)
 Moniot d'Arras (fl c.1250–75)
 Robert de Clari (late twelfth century)
 Blondel de Nesle (late twelfth century)
 Robert de Boron (twelfth–thirteenth century)
 Guiot de Provins (d. after 1208)
 Bertrand de Bar-sur-Aube (late twelfth-early thirteenth century)
 Guillaume de Lorris (c.1200 – c.1238)
 Theobald IV of Champagne (1201–1253)
 Jean de Joinville ( c.1224 – c.1317)
 Rutebeuf (c.1230 – c.1285)
 Adam de la Halle (c.1250 – c.1285)
 Jean de Meung or Jean de Meun (1250 – c.1305) or Jean Clopinel or Chopinel
 Jacques Bretel (c. 1285 – c. 1310)
 Jean Le Bel (c.1290–1370)
 Colin Muset (end of thirteenth century)
 Guillaume de Machaut ( c.1300 – c.1377)
 Nicole Oresme (1325–1382)
 Philippe de Mézières (c.1327–1405)
 Jean Froissart (1333 – c.1404)
 Eustache Deschamps (c.1346 – c.1407)
 Jean Charlier called Gerson (1363–1429
 Christine de Pisan (1364–1430)
 Alain Chartier (c.1385 – c.1435)
 Jean Juvénal des Ursins (1388–1473)
 Antoine de la Sale (1388 – c.1469)
 Enguerrand de Monstrelet (c.1390 – c.1453)
 Charles, duc d'Orléans (1394–1465)

Fifteenth century

 Martin Le Franc (c.1410–1461)
 Eustache Marcadé (1414–1440)
 Georges Chastellain (1415–1475)
 Olivier de la Marche (1425–1502)
 Martial d'Auvergne ( c.1430–1508)
 François Villon (c.1431–after 1463)
 Jean Michel (c.1435–1501)
 Jean Molinet (1435–1507)
 Philippe de Commines (1445–1511)
 Jean Marot (1450–1526)
 Lefèvre d'Etaples (1455–1537)
 Guillaume Crétin (Guillaume Dubois) (1460–1525)
 Octavien de Saint-Gelais (1468–1505)
 Guillaume Budé (1468–1540)
 Jean Meschinot (active from 1450–1490)
 Guillaume Alexis (active from 1450–1490)
 Jean Lemaire de Belges (1473 – c.1525)
 Pierre Gringore or Gringoire (c.1475–1538/1539)
 François Rabelais (c.1483–1553)
 Aliénor de Poitiers (fl.1484)
 Mellin de Saint-Gelais (c.1491–1558)
 Marguerite de Navarre (c.1492–1549)
 Clément Marot (c.1496–1544)

Sixteenth century

1500–1549

 Bonaventure des Périers (c.1500–1544)
 Maurice Scève (c.1505 – c.1562)
 Michel de l'Hospital (1505–1573)
 Étienne Dolet (1509–1546)
 Jean Calvin (1509–1564)
 Hélisenne de Crenne (Marguerite Briet de Crenne) (c.1510–after 1552)
 Pierre Viret (1511–1571)
 Charles de Sainte-Marthe (1512–1555)
 Thomas Sébillet (c.1512–1589)
 Jacques Amyot (1513–1593)
 Jacques Peletier du Mans (1517–1582)
 Théodore de Bèze (1519–1605)
 Pierre de Saint-Julien de Balleure (1519–1593)
 Denis Sauvage (1520–1587)
 Noël du Fail (1520–1591)
 Pernette Du Guillet (c.1520–1545)
 Jacques Yver (1520–1570)
 Gilles de Gouberville (1521–1578)
 Pontus de Tyard or de Thiard (1521–1605)
 Joachim du Bellay (1522–1560)
 Pierre de Ronsard (1524–1585)
 Pierre Boaistuau (?–1566)
 Louise Labé (c.1526 – c.1565)
 Rémy Belleau (1528–1577)
 Étienne Pasquier (1529–1615)
 Étienne de La Boétie (1530–1563)
 Claude Fauchet (1530–1601)
 Jean Bodin (1530–1596)
 François de Belleforest (1530–1583)
 Henri Estienne (1531–1598)
 Jean Antoine de Baïf (1532–1589)
 Étienne Jodelle (1532–1573)
 Michel de Montaigne (Michel Eyquem, seigneur de Montaigne) (1533–1592)
 Jean de la Taille (c.1533/1540 – c.1617)
 Robert Garnier (1534–1590)
 Nicolas Rapin (1535–1608)
 Jacques Grévin (1538–1570)
 Olivier de Serres (1539–1619)
 Pierre Pithou (1539–1596)
 Pierre de Bourdeille, seigneur de Brantôme (1540–1614)
 Pierre de Larivey (1540–1619)
 Florent Chrestien (1540–1596)
 Pierre Charron (1541–1603)
 Guillaume de Salluste Du Bartas (1544–1590)
 Antoine du Verdier (1544–1600)
 Philippe Desportes (1546–1606)
 Pierre de L'Estoile (1546–1611)
 Jean de La Ceppède (1548–1623)
 Philippe Duplessis-Mornay (Philippe de Mornay, called Duplessis-Mornay) (1549–1623)

1550–1599

 Benigne Poissenot (c.1550–?)
 François d'Amboise (1550–1619)
 Odet de Turnèbe (1552–1581)
 Jean Bertaut (1552–1611)
 Théodore Agrippa d'Aubigné (1552–1630)
 François de Malherbe (1552–1630)
 Jacques Davy Du Perron (1556–1618)
 François Béroalde de Verville (1556–1626)
 Guillaume du Vair (1556–1621)
 Jean de Sponde (1557–1595)
 Maximilien de Béthune, baron de Rosny, duc de Sully (1560–1641)
 Alexandre Hardy (1560/1570 – c.1632)
 Nicolas de Montreux (1561–1608)
 Pierre Matthieu (1563–1621)
 Eustache de Refuge, seigneur de Précy et de Courcelles (1564–1617)
 Saint François de Sales (1567–1622)
 Honoré d'Urfé (1567–1625)
 Scipion Dupleix (1569–1661)
 Sylvestre de Laval (1570–1616)
 Antoine de Nervèze (c.1570–after 1622)
 Nicolas des Escuteaux (after 1570 – c.1628)
 François du Souhait (between 1570 & 1580–1617)
 Jean Ogier de Gombaud (1570–1666)
 Antoine de Balinghem (1571–1630)
 Mathurin Régnier (1573–1613)
 Nicholas Camusat (1575–1655)
 Antoine de Montchrestien (c.1575–1621)
 Henri, duc de Rohan (1579–1638)
 Saint Vincent de Paul (1581–1660)
 Jean Duvergier de Hauranne, abbé de Saint-Cyran (1581–1643)
 François Maynard (1582–1646)
 Jean-Pierre Camus (1584–1652)
 Francis Garasse (1585–1631)
 Jean de Schelandre (c.1585–1635)
 François de La Mothe-Le-Vayer (1588–1672)
 Honorat de Bueil, seigneur de Racan (1589–1670)
 Bertrand de Loque (1589)
 Théophile de Viau (1590–1626)
 Marc Gilbert de Varennes (1591–1660)
 François le Métel de Boisrobert (1592–1662)
 Antoine Gérard de Saint-Amant (1594–1661)
 Jean Chapelain (1595–1674)
 Jean Desmarets de Saint-Sorlin (1595–1676)
 René Descartes (1596–1650)
 Claude de Malleville (1597–1647)
 Vincent Voiture (1597–1648)
 Jean-Louis Guez de Balzac (1597–1684)

Seventeenth century

1600–1649

 Nicolas de Bralion (1600–1672)
 Marin le Roy de Gomberville (1600–1674)
 Georges de Scudéry (1601–1667)
 François Tristan l'Hermite (1601–1655)
 Guy Patin (1601–1672)
 Jean de Bernieres-Louvigny (1602–1659)
 Charles Sorel (1602–1674)
 Charles Cotin (1604–1682)
 Jean Mairet (1604–1686)
 François Hédelin, abbé d'Aubignac (1604–1676)
 Pierre du Ryer (1605–1658)
 Charles Coypeau d'Assoucy (1605–1675)
 Jean François Sarrazin (1605–1654)
 Pierre Corneille (1606–1684)
 Antoine Gombaud, chevalier de Méré (1607–1685)
 Madeleine de Scudéry (1607–1701)
 Jean Rotrou (1609–1650)
 Paul Scarron (1610–1660)
 François-Eudes de Mézeray (1610–1683)
 Charles de Saint-Evremond (c.1610–1703)
 Antoine Arnauld (1612–1694)
 Isaac de Benserade (1612–1691)
 Jean François Paul de Gondi, cardinal de Retz (1613–1679)
 François de La Rochefoucauld (1613–1680)
 Gauthier de Costes, seigneur de la Calprenède (1614–1663)
 Georges de Brébeuf (1618–1661)
 Roger de Rabutin, Comte de Bussy, called Bussy-Rabutin (1618–1693)
 Cyrano de Bergerac (Hector-Savinien Cyrano de Bergerac) (1619–1655)
 Antoine Furetière (1619–1688)
 Gédéon Tallemant des Réaux (1619–1692)
 Jean de La Fontaine (1621–1695)
 Molière (Jean-Baptiste Poquelin) (1622–1673)
 Blaise Pascal (1623–1662)
 Jean Renaud de Segrais (1624–1701)
 Paul Pellisson (1624–1693)
 Thomas Corneille (1625–1709)
 Samuel Chappuzeau (1625–1701)
 Madame de Sévigné (Marie de Rabutin-Chantal, marquise de Sévigné) (1626–1696)
 Laurent Drelincourt (1626–1680)
 Jacques Bénigne Bossuet (1627–1704)
 Gabriel-Joseph de La Vergne, comte de Guilleragues (1628–1685)
 Charles Perrault (1628–1703)
 Pierre Daniel Huet (1630–1721)
 Louis Bourdaloue (1632–1704)
 Esprit Fléchier (1632–1710)
 Jacques Pradon (1632–1698)
 Madame de Villedieu (Marie-Catherine-Hortence Desjardins, marquise de Villedieu) (1632–1683)
 Madame de Lafayette (Marie-Madeleine, comtesse de La Fayette) (1634–1693)
 Pierre Thomas, sieur du Fossé (1634–1698)
 Philippe Quinault (1635–1688)
 Nicolas Boileau (1636–1711)
 Edmé Boursault (1638–1701)
 Antoinette du Ligier de la Garde Deshoulières (1638–1694)
 Nicolas Malebranche (1638–1715)
 Jean Donneau de Visé (1638–1710)
 Philippe de Courcillon, marquis de Dangeau (1638–1720)
 Claude Estiennot de la Serre (1639–1699)
 Guillaume Amfrye de Chaulieu (1639–1720)
 César Vichard de Saint-Réal (1639–1692)
 Jean Racine (1639–1699)
 Claude de Fleury (1640–1723)
 Louis Moréri (1643–1680)
 Gatien de Courtilz de Sandras (1644–1712)
 Anne de La Roche-Guilhem (1644–1707)
 Jean de La Bruyère (1645–1696)
 Pierre Le Pesant, sieur de Boisguilbert ( c.1646–1714)
 Antoine Galland (1646–1715)
 Pierre Bayle (1647–1706)
 Joseph Anthelmi (1648–1697)

1650–1699

 Madame d'Aulnoy (Marie-Catherine le Jumelle de Barneville, Baronne d'Aulnoy) (1651–1705)
 François de Salignac de la Mothe-Fénelon (1651–1715)
 Louis Du Four de Longuerue (1652–1733)
 Charlotte-Rose de Caumont La Force (Mademoiselle de La Force) (1650–1724)
 Louis Legendre (1655–1733)
 Jean-François Regnard (1655–1709)
 Jean Galbert de Campistron (1656–1723)
 Bernard le Bovier de Fontenelle (1657–1757)
 Louis (or Jean) de Mailly (1657-1724)
 Henri de Boulainvilliers (1658–1712)
 François Armand Gervaise (1660–1761)
 Charles Rollin (1661–1741)
 Florent Carton Dancourt (1661–1725)
 Jean-François Foucquet (1665–1741)
 Alain-René Lesage (1668–1747)
 Jacques Bouillart (1669–1726)
 Jean-Baptiste Rousseau (1670–1741)
 Jean-Baptiste Dubos (1670–1742)
 Prosper Jolyot de Crébillon (Crébillon père) (1674–1762)
 Louis de Rouvroy, duc de Saint-Simon (1675–1755)
 Jean-François Boyer (1675–1755)
 Philippe Néricault Destouches (1680–1754)
 Claudine Alexandrine Guérin de Tencin (Madame de Tencin) (1681–1749)
 Jérôme Besoigne (1686–1763)
 Marivaux (Pierre Carlet de Chamblain de Marivaux) (1688–1763)
 Alexis Piron (1689–1773)
 Montesquieu (Charles Louis de Secondat, baron de Montesquieu) (1689–1755)
 Louis Petit de Bachaumont (1690–1771)
 Voltaire (François-Marie Arouet) (1694–1778)
 René-Louis de Voyer de Paulmy, marquis d' Argenson (1694–1757)
 Françoise de Graffigny (1695–1758)
 Antoine François Prévost (Antoine Francois Prevost d'Exiles) a/k/a Abbé Prévost (1697–1763)
 Marie Anne de Vichy-Chamrond, marquise du Deffand (1697–1780)
 Denis-François Camusat (1697–1732)

Eighteenth century

1700–1749

 Charles Pinot Duclos (1704–1772)
 Claude Prosper Jolyot de Crébillon (Crébillon, fils) (1707–1777)
 Georges-Louis Leclerc, Comte de Buffon (Georges Louis Leclerc, comte de Buffon) (1707–1788)
 Julien Offray de La Mettrie (1709–1751)
 Gabriel Bonnot de Mably (1709–1785)
 Jean-Baptiste-Louis Gresset (1709–1777)
 Jean-Jacques Lefranc, marquis de Pompignan (1709–1784)
 Charles-Simon Favart (1710–1792)
 Jean-Jacques Rousseau (1712–1778)
 Denis Diderot (1713–1784)
 Étienne Bonnot de Condillac (1714–1780)
 Marie Jeanne Riccoboni (Madame Riccoboni) (1714–1792)
 Claude Adrien Helvétius (1715–1771)
 Vauvenargues (Luc de Clapiers, marquis de Vauvenargues) (1715–1747)
 François-André-Adrien Pluquet (1716–1790)
 Jean-François de Saint-Lambert (1716–1803)
 Louis Carrogis Carmontelle (1717–1806
 Jean Le Rond d'Alembert (1717–1783)
 Michel-Jean Sedaine (1719–1797)
 Antoine Henri de Bérault-Bercastel (1720–c.1794)
 Jacques Cazotte (1720–1792)
 Denis Dominique Cardonne (1721–1783)
 Tiphaigne de la Roche (Charles-François Tiphaigne de la Roche) (1722–1774)
 Baron d'Holbach (Paul Henri Dietrich, baron d'Holbach) (1723–1789)
 Jean-François Marmontel (1723–1799)
 Casanova a/k/a Jacques Casanova de Seingalt (1725–1798)
 Anne Robert Jacques Turgot, Baron de Laune (1727–1781)
 Jean Dussaulx (1728–1799)
 Nicolas Bricaire de la Dixmerie (c.1730–1791)
 Pierre-Augustin Caron de Beaumarchais (1732–1799)
 Jacques Clinchamps de Malfilâtre (1733–1767)
 Nicolas Edme Restif de La Bretonne (1734–1806)
 Jean-Benjamin François de la Borde (1734–1794)
 Charles Joseph, Prince de Ligne (1735–1814)
 Jacques-Henri Bernardin de Saint-Pierre (1737–1814)
 Jacques Delille (1738–1813)
 Jean-François de la Harpe (1739–1803)
 Marquis de Sade (Donatien Alphonse François de Sade) (1740–1814)
 Isabelle de Charrière a/k/a Belle de Zuylen (1740–1805)
 Pierre-Ambroise Choderlos de Laclos (1741–1803)
 Condorcet (Marie Jean Antoine Caritat, marquis de Condorcet) (1744–1794)
 Gabriel Brizard (c1744–1793)
 André-Samuel-Michel Cantwell (1744–1802)
 Étienne Pélabon (1745–1808)
 Jean Antoine Roucher (1745–1794)
 Jean-Sifrein Maury (Abbé Maury) (1746–1817)
 Joseph-Alexandre-Victor Hupay de Fuveau (1746–1818)
 Stéphanie Félicité Ducrest de St-Albin, comtesse de Genlis (Madame de Genlis) (1746–1830)
 Armand Louis de Gontaut, duc de Biron, duc de Lauzun (1747–1793)
 Olympe de Gouges (1748–1793)
 Pierre-Louis Ginguené (1748–1815)
 Honoré Gabriel Riqueti, comte de Mirabeau (1749–1791)
 Jean-Marie Collot d'Herbois (1749–1796)

1750–1799

 Georges Henri Victor Collot (1750-1805)
 Nicolas Joseph Laurent Gilbert (1751–1780)
 Évariste de Forges de Parny (1753–1814)
 Joseph de Maistre (1753–1821)
 Jean Armand Charlemagne (1753-1838)
 Marie Thérèse Péroux d’Abany (1753–1821)
 Joseph Joubert (1754–1824)
 Jean-Pierre Claris de Florian (1754–1794)
 Jacques Pierre Brissot a/k/a Jean-Pierre Brissot (1754–1793)
 Charles Maurice de Talleyrand (1754–1838)
 Constantin François de Chasseboeuf, Comte de Volney (1757–1820)
 William Vincent Barré (c.1760–1829)
 Victoire Babois (1760–1839)
 Adelaide Filleul, Marquise de Souza-Botelho (Madame de Souza) (1761–1836)
 André Chénier (1762–1794)
 Claude-François-Xavier Mercier de Compiègne (1763–1800)
 Joseph Chénier (1764–1811)
 Barbara Juliana, Baroness von Krüdener (Madame de Krüdener) (1764–1824)
 Madame de Staël (1766–1817)
 Las Cases (Emmanuel-Augustin-Dieudonné, comte de Las Cases) (1766–1842)
 Benjamin Constant (Benjamin Constant de Rebecque) (1767–1830)
 Joseph Fiévée (1767–1839)
 François-René de Chateaubriand (1768–1848)
 Étienne Pivert de Senancour (1770–1846)
 Fanny Raoul (1771-1833)
 Sophie de Renneville (1772–1822)
 Charles-Jean Baptiste Bonnin (1772–1846)
 Paul Louis Courier de Méré (1772–1825)
 René Charles Guilbert de Pixérécourt (1773–1844)
 Sophie Ristaud Cottin (Madame Cottin) (1773–1807)
 Eugène François Vidocq (1775–1857)
 Claire de Duras (Madame de Duras) (1777–1828)
 Ambroise Rendu (1778–1860)
 Charles Nodier (1780–1844)
 Pierre-Jean de Béranger (1780–1857)
 Victor de Bonald (1780–1871)
 Aimé Martin (1781-1844)
 Félicité Robert de Lamennais (1782–1854)
 Amable Guillaume Prosper Brugière, baron de Barante (1782–1866)
 Victor Henri-Joseph Brahain Ducange (1783–1833)
 Stendhal (Henri Beyle) (1783–1842) (The Red and the Black, 1830)
 Pierre-Antoine Lebrun (1785–1873)
 Marceline Desbordes-Valmore (1786–1859)
 Alphonse Rabbe (1786–1829)
 Élise Voïart (1786–1866)
 François Guizot (1787–1874)
 Alexandre Guiraud (1788–1847)
 Alphonse de Lamartine (1790–1869)
 Victor Cousin (1792–1867)
 Charles Paul de Kock (1793–1871)
 Jean-M.-Vincent Audin (1793)
 Casimir Delavigne (Jean-François Casimir Delavigne) (1793–1843)
 François Stoepel (1794–1836)
 Rosine de Chabaud-Latour (1794–1860)
 Arthur Dinaux (1795–1864)
 Amédée Pichot (1795–1877)
 Modeste Gruau (1795–1883)
 Augustin Thierry (1795–1856)
 Zulma Carraud (1796–1889)
 François Mignet (1796–1884)
 Alfred de Vigny (1797–1863)
 Antoinette Henriette Clémence Robert (1797–1872)
 Adolphe Thiers (1797–1877)
 Auguste Comte (1798–1857)
 Eugène Delacroix (1798–1863)
 Charles Dezobry (1798–1871)
 Jules Michelet (1798–1874)
 Sophie Rostopchine, Comtesse de Ségur (1799–1874)
 Honoré de Balzac (1799–1850)

Nineteenth century

1800–1824

 Pierre Alexandre Jean Mollière (1800–1850)
 Victor Hugo (1802–1885) (Les Misérables, 1862)
 Alexandre Dumas, père (1802–1870)
 Prosper Mérimée (1803–1870)
 Edgar Quinet (1803–1875)
 Eugène Daumas (1803–1871)
 Eugène Sue (1804–1857)
 Charles-Augustin Sainte-Beuve (1804–1869)
 Jules Janin (1804–1874)
 George Sand (Amandine-Lucie-Aurore Dupin, baronne Dudevant) (1804–1876)
 Alexis Henri Charles Clérel, comte de Tocqueville (1805–1859)
 Jules-Romain Tardieu (1805–1868)
 Émile de Girardin (1806–1881)
 Désiré Nisard (1806–1888)
 Émile Souvestre (1806–1854)
 Aloysius Bertrand (1807–1841)
 Gérard de Nerval (Gérard Labrunie) (1808–1855)
 Jules-Amédée Barbey d'Aurevilly (1808–1889)
 Jacques Claude Demogeot (1808–1894)
 Lucien de la Hodde (1808–1865)
 Frédéric Villot (1809–1875)
 Petrus Borel (1809–1859)
 Pierre-Joseph Proudhon (1809–1865)
 Xavier Forneret (1809–1884)
 Hégésippe Moreau (1810–1838)
 Maurice de Guérin (1810–1839)
 Alfred de Musset (1810–1857)
 Joseph Bouchardy (1810–1870)
 Alphonse Jolly (1810–1893)
 Pier Angelo Fiorentino (1811–1864)
 Armand de Pontmartin (1811–1890)
 Adolphe-Philippe d'Ennery (1811–1889)
 Théophile Gautier (1811–1872)
 Louis Blanc (1811–1882)
 Victor de Laprade (1812–1883)
 Louis du Couret (1812–1867)
 Eugène Bonnemère (1813–1893)
 Eugène Labiche (1815–1888)
 Joseph Arthur de Gobineau (1816–1882)
 Victor Séjour (1817–1874)
 Paul Féval, père (1817–1887)
 Adine Riom (1818–1899)
 Charles-Marie Leconte de Lisle (1818–1894)
 Eugène Despois (1818–1876)
 Jean Baptiste Marius Augustin Challamel (1818–1894)
 Adèle Hommaire de Hell (1819–1883), travel writer
 Eugène Fromentin (1820–1876)
 Émile Augier (1820–1889)
 Antoine-Élisabeth-Cléophas Dareste de la Chavanne (1820–1882)
 Jules Pizzetta (1820–1900)
 Charles Baudelaire (1821–1867) (Les Fleurs du mal, 1857)
 Gustave Flaubert (1821–1880) (Madame Bovary, 1857)
 Octave Feuillet (1821–1890)
 Jules-François-Félix Husson a/k/a Champfleury (1821–1889)
 Edmond de Goncourt (1822–1896)
 Erckmann-Chatrian (Emile Erckmann & Alexandre Chatrian) (1822–1899 & 1826–1890)
 Louis-Nicolas Ménard (1822–1901)
 Théodore de Banville (1823–1891)
 Ernest Renan (1823–1892)
 Alexandre Dumas, fils (1824–1895)

1825–1849
 Sainte Suzanne Melvil-Bloncourt (1825–1880)
 Jean-Félix Nourrisson (1825–1899)
 Charles De Coster (1827–1879)
 Clair Tisseur (Nizier du Puitspelu) (1827–1896)
 Edmond About (1828–1885)
 Hyppolyte Taine (1828–1893)
 Jules Verne (1828–1905)
 Pauline Cassin Caro (1828/34/35 - 1901)
 Zénaïde Fleuriot (1829–1890)
 Numa-Denis Fustel de Coulanges (1830–1889)
 Jules de Goncourt (1830–1870)
 Hector Malot (1830–1907)
 Henri Rochefort (1830–1913)
 Henri Meilhac (1831–1897)
 Victorien Sardou (1831–1908)
 Émile Gaboriau (1832–1873)
 Jules Vallès (1832–1885)
 Gaston Lavalley (1834–1922)
 Claire Julie de Nanteuil (1834-1897)
 Édouard Pailleron (1834–1899)
 Ludovic Halévy (1834–1908)
 Jean-Marie Déguignet (1834–1905)
 Amélie Gex (Dian de la Jeânna) (1835–1883)
 Félix Narjoux (1836–1891)
 Jules Simon Troubat (1836–1914)
 Constant Fouard (1837–1903)
 Henry Becque (1837–1899)
 Auguste Villiers de l'Isle-Adam (1838–1889)
 Lucie Boissonnas (1839 -1877)
 Sully Prudhomme (1839–1907)
 Jules Lermina (1839–1913)
 Alphonse Daudet (1840–1897)
 Émile Zola (1840–1902)
 Arvède Barine (1840–1908)
 Jules Claretie (1840–1913)
 Catulle Mendès (1841–1909)
 Charles Cros (1842–1888)
 Stéphane Mallarmé (1842–1898)
 José María de Heredia (1842–1905)
 François Coppée (1842–1908)
 Albert Sorel (1842–1906)
 René de Lespinasse (1843–1922)
 Paul Arène (1843–1896)
 Paul Verlaine (1844–1896)
 Anatole France (Anatole François Thibault) (1844–1924)
 Tristan Corbière (Edouard-Joachim) (1845–1875)
 Comte de Lautréamont (Isidore Lucien Ducasse) (1846–1870)
 Léon Bloy (1846–1917)
 Auguste Edgard Dietrich (1846)
 Henri François Marion (1846–1896)
 Geoffroi Jacques Flach (1846–1919)
 Brada (writer) (1847-1938)
 Émile Faguet (1847–1916)
 Joris-Karl Huysmans (1848–1907)
 Octave Mirbeau (1848–1917)
 Georges de Peyrebrune (1848–1917)
 Ferdinand Brunetière (1849–1906)
 Jean Richepin (1849–1926)
 Georges de Porto-Riche (1849–1930)

1850–1859

 Guy de Maupassant (1850–1893)
 Pierre Loti (Julien Viaud) (1850–1923)
 Gyp (1850–1932)
 Germain Nouveau (1851–1920)
 Élémir Bourges (1852–1925)
 Paul Bourget (1852–1935)
 Alfred Masson-Forestier (1852–1912)
 Maurice Rollinat (1853–1903)
 Arthur Rimbaud (1854–1891), Une Saison en Enfer
 Alphonse Allais (1854–1905)
 Laurent Tailhade (1854–1919)
 Georges Rodenbach (1855–1898)
 Jean Lorrain (1855–1906)
 Émile Verhaeren (1855–1916)
 Adolphe Chenevière (1855–1917)
 Noël Valois (1855–1915)
 Marie Lion (1855-1922)
 Jean Moréas (Jean Papadiamantopoulos) (1856–1910)
 Pierre Decourcelle (1856–1926)
 Gustave Lanson (1857–1934)
 Albert Samain (1858–1900)
 Jules Lemaître (1858–1915)
 Remy de Gourmont (1858–1915)
 Émile Durkheim (1858–1917)
 Alfred Capus (1858–1922)
 Georges Courteline (Georges Moineaux) (1858–1929)
 Neel Doff (1858–1942)
 Jean-Baptiste Chautard (1858–1935)
 Henri Danoy (1859–1928)
 Gustave Belot (1859–1929)
 Paul Naudet (1859–1929)
 Anatole Le Braz (1859–1926)
 Gustave Kahn (1859–1936)
 Henri Bergson (1859–1941)

1860–1869

 Jules Laforgue (1860–1887)
 Paul Margueritte (1860–1918)
 Michel Zévaco (1860–1918)
 Paul Roux a/k/a Saint-Pol-Roux le Magnifique (1861–1940)
 Paul Adam (1862–1920)
 Georges Darien (1862–1921)
 Georges Feydeau (1862–1921)
 Maurice Barrès (1862–1923)
 Maurice Maeterlinck (1862–1949)
 Stuart Merrill (1863–1915)
 Marguerite Audoux (1863–1937)
 Jules Renard (1864–1910)
 Henri de Régnier (1864–1936)
 Léon Broutin (fl. 1865–77) 
 Maurice Leblanc (1864–1941)
 Juliette Heuzey (1865-1952)
 Romain Rolland (1866–1944)
 Tristan Bernard (1866–1947)
 Fortunat Strowski (1866–1952)
 Charles de Beaupoil, comte de Saint-Aulaire (1866–1954)
 Émile Lauvrière (1866–1954)
 René Boylesve (René Tardivaux) (1867–1926
 Jehan Rictus (Gabriel Randon) (1867–1933)
 Léon Daudet (1867–1942)
 Marcel Schwob (1867–1905)
 Paul-Jean Toulet (1867–1920)
 Romain Coolus (1868–1952)
 Edmond Rostand (1868–1918)
 Gaston Leroux (1868–1927) (The Phantom of the Opera, Le Mystère de la chambre jaune)
 Achille Essebac (1868–1936)
 Francis Jammes (1868–1938)
 Émile Auguste Chartier a/k/a "Alain" (1868–1951)
 Paul Claudel (1868–1955)
 André Spire (1868–1966)
 Gaston Arman de Caillavet (1869–1915)
 Augustin Chaboseau (1868–1946)
 André Gide (1869–1951)

1870–1879

 Marcelle Tinayre (1870–1948)
 Henri Bordeaux (1870–1963)
 Pierre Louÿs (Pierre Louis) (1870–1925)
 Maximilien Winter (1871–1935)
 André Chéradame (1871–1948)
 Albert Geouffre de Lapradelle (1871–1955)
 Gaston Brière (1871–1962)
 Marcel Proust (1871–1922), In Search of Lost Time
 Paul Valéry (1871–1945)
 Louis Madelin (1871–1956)
 Henry Bataille (1872–1922)
 Robert de Flers (1872–1927)
 Paul Fort (1872–1960)
 Alfred Jarry (1873–1907)
 Charles Péguy (1873–1914)
 Henri Barbusse (1873–1935)
 Colette (Sidonie Gabrielle Colette) (1873–1954)
 Alice Jouenne (1873-1954)
 Pierre Souvestre (1874–1914)
 Albert Thibaudet (1874–1936)
 Tristan Klingsor (1874–1966)
 Binet-Valmer (1875–1940)
 Paul Watrin (1876–1950)
 Anna de Noailles (Anne de Brancovan, comtesse de Noailles) (1876–1933)
 Max Jacob (1876–1944)
 Léon-Paul Fargue (1876–1947)
 Pierre Albert-Birot (1876–1967)
 Marcel Bouteron (1877–1962)
 Raymond Roussel (1877–1933)
 Oscar Venceslas de Lubicz-Milosz (1877–1939)
 Charles Ferdinand Ramuz, dit C. F. Ramuz (1878–1947)
 Victor Segalen (1878–1919)
 Henry de Monfreid (1879–1974)
 Francis Picabia (1879–1953)
 Henri Fauconnier (1879–1973)

1880–1889

 Louis Hémon (1880–1913)
 Guillaume Apollinaire (Wilhelm Apollinaris de Kostrowitzky) (1880–1918)
 Lucie Delarue-Mardrus (1880–1945)
 Francis de Miomandre (Francis Durand) (1880–1959)
 Alzir Hella (1881–1953)
 Valery Larbaud (1881–1957)
 Roger Martin du Gard (1881–1958)
 Camille Drevet (1881-1969)
 André Salmon (1881–1969)
 Jérôme Carcopino (1881–1970)
 Louis Pergaud (1882–1915)
 Jean Giraudoux (1882–1944)
 André Billy (1882–1971)
 Pierre MacOrlan (Pierre Dumarchais) (1883–1970)
 Rose Combe (1883–1932)
 Marie Noël (1883–1933)
 Auguste Detœuf (1883–1947)
 Albert Pauphilet (1884–1948)
 Jules Supervielle (1884–1960
 Gaston Bachelard (1884–1962)
 Georges Duhamel (1884–1966)
 Jacques Chardonne (Jacques Boutelleau) (1884–1968)
 Jean Paulhan (1884–1968)
 Alexandre Arnoux (1884–1973)
 Georges Ribemont-Dessaignes (1884–1974)
 René Hubert (1885–1954)
 Sacha Guitry (1885–1957)
 André Maurois (Emile Herzog) (1885–1967)
 Fernand Crommelynck (1885–1970)
 Jules Romains (Jules-Louis de Farigoule) (1885–1972)
 Marthe Bibesco (1885–1973)
 Alain-Fournier (Henri Fournier) (1886–1914)
 Francis Carco (François Carcopino-Tusoli) (1886–1958)
 Pierre Benoit (1886–1962)
 Geneviève Fauconnier (1886–1969)
 Roland Dorgelès (Roland Lecavelé) (1886–1973)
 Jean-Charles Roman d'Amat (1887–1976)
 Henri Pourrat (1887–1959)
 Jean de La Varende (Jean-Balthazar Mallard, comte de La Varende) (1887–1959)
 René Maran (1887-1960)
 Blaise Cendrars (1887–1961)
 François Mauriac (1887–1970)
 Saint-John Perse (Alexis Léger) (1887–1975)
 Pierre-Jean Jouve (1887–1976)
 Marcel Martinet (1887–1944)
 Georges Bernanos (1888–1948)
 Henri Bosco (1888–1976)
 Paul Morand (1888–1976)
 Marcel Jouhandeau (1888–1979)
 Jacques de Lacretelle (1888–1985)
 Tristan Derème (1889–1941)
 Pierre Reverdy (1889–1960)
 Jean Cocteau (1889–1963)
 Émile Henriot (1889–1961)

1890–1899

 Henriette Sauret (1890-1976)
 Maurice Genevoix (1890–1980)
 Victor Serge (1890–1947)
 Leilah Mahi (1890–1932)
 Édouard Dunglas (1891–1952)
 La Mazille (1891–1984)
 Max Ernst (1891–1976)
 Pierre Drieu La Rochelle (1893–1945)
 Edmond Brazès (1893 - 1980)
 Luc Benoist (1893–1980)
 Paul Foulquié (1893–1983)
 Claude Cahun (Lucy Schwob) (1894–1954)
 Louis-Ferdinand Céline (Louis Destouches) (1894–1961) (Voyage au bout de la nuit, 1932)
 Paul Éluard (Eugène Grindel) (1895–1952)
 Jean Giono (1895–1970)
 Marcel Pagnol (1895–1974)
 Albert Cohen (1895–1981)
 Antonin Artaud (1896–1948)
 André Breton (1896–1966)
 Henry de Montherlant (Henry Millon de Montherlant) (1896–1972)
 Paulette Nardal (1896–1995)
 Tristan Tzara (1896–1963)
 Elsa Triolet (1896–1970)
 Louis Aragon (1897–1982)
 Georges Bataille (1897–1962)
 Joë Bousquet (1897–1950)
 Philippe Soupault (1897–1990)
 Marcel Thiry (1897–1977)
 Eugène Dabit (1898–1936)
 Michel de Ghelderode (1898–1962)
 Joseph Kessel (1898–1979)
 Paul Vialar (1898–1996)
 Louise Noëlle Malclès (1899–1977)
 Roger Vitrac (1899–1952)
 Pierre Virion (1899–1988)
 Jacques Audiberti (1899–1965)
 Marcel Achard (1899–1974)
 Louis Guilloux (1899–1980)
 Henri Michaux (1899–1984)
 Marcel Arland (1899–1986)
 Marcelle Auclair (1899–1983)
 Armand Salacrou (1899–1989)
 Francis Ponge (1899–1988)

Twentieth century

1900–1909

 Antoine de Saint-Exupéry (1900–1944)
 Robert Desnos (1900–1945)
 Jacques Prévert (1900–1977)
 André Chamson (1900–1983)
 André Dhôtel (1900–1991)
 Albert Ayguesparse (1900–1996)
 Julien Green (1900–1998)
 Nathalie Sarraute (1900–1999)
 Amadou Hampâté Bâ (1900 or 1901–1991)
 Georges Limbour (1900–1970)
 Marcel Sendrail (1900–1976)
 Jacques Bordiot (1900–1983)
 Maurice Féaudierre (1901)
 Jean Meuvret (1901–1971)
 Jean-Joseph Rabearivelo (1901–1937)
 Jean Prévost (1901–1944)
 Henri Daniel-Rops (Henri Petiot) (1901–1965)
 Lanza del Vasto (1901–1981)
 Charles Lecocq (1901–1922)
 Michel Leiris (1901–1990)
 Suzanne Lilar (1901–1992)
 André Malraux (1901–1976)
 Marcel Aymé (1902–1967)
 Fernand Braudel (1902–1985)
 Marie-Magdeleine Carbet (1902-1996)
 Julien Torma (1902–1933)
 Louise de Vilmorin (1902–1969)
 Vercors (pseudonym for Jean Bruller) (1902–1991)
 Jean Tardieu (1903–1995)
 Raymond Radiguet (1903–1923)
 Irène Némirovsky (1903–1942)
 Jean Follain (1903–1971)
 Georges Simenon (1903–1989)
 Raymond Queneau (1903–1976)
 Marguerite Yourcenar (Marguerite de Crayencour) (1903–1987)
 René Bansard (1904–1971)
 Marie-Anne Desmarest (1904–1973)
 Gilbert Lely (1904–1985)
 Yves Congar (1904–1995)
 Jean-Paul Sartre (1905–1980)
 Maurice Fombeure (1906–1981)
 Charles Exbrayat (1906–1989)
 Samuel Beckett (1906–1989)
 René Sédillot (1906–1999)
 Léopold Sédar Senghor (1906–2001)
 Roger Vailland (1907–1965)
 Pauline Réage (Anne Desclos) (1907–1998)
 Violette Leduc (1907–1972)
 Raymond Abellio (Georges Soulès) (1907–1986)
 René Char (1907–1988)
 Maurice Blanchot (1907–2003)
 René Ménil (1907–2004)
 Roger Peyrefitte (1907–2000)
 Roger Gilbert-Lecomte (1907–1943)
 Jacques Roumain (1907–1944)
 René Daumal (1908–1944)
 Simone de Beauvoir (1908–1986)
 Paul Bénichou (1908–2001)
 Robert Merle (1908–2004)
 Simone Weil (1909–1943)
 Stéphane Pizella (1909–1970)
 Anaïs Nin (1909–1977)
 Jean-Fernand Brierre (1909–1993)
 Robert Brasillach (1909–1945)
 André Pieyre de Mandiargues (1909–1991)
 Léo Malet (1909–1996)

1910–1919

 Jean Anouilh (1910–1987)
 Jean-Louis Baghio'o (1910–1994)
 Jean Genet (1910–1986)
 Paul Guth (1910–1997)
 Julien Gracq (Louis Poirier) (1910–2007)
 Emil Cioran (1911–1995)
 Raphaël Tardon (1911–1967)
 André Hardellet (1911–1974)
 René Barjavel (1911–1985)
 Guy des Cars (Guy de Pérusse des Cars) (1911–1993)
 Hervé Bazin (Jean Hervé-Bazin) (1911–1996)
 Jean Cayrol (1911–2005)
 Henri Troyat (Lev Tarassov) (1911–2007)
 André Jardin (1912–1996)
 Pierre Boulle (1912–1994)
 Edmond Jabès (1912–1991)
 Eugène Ionesco (1912–1994)
 Jacques de Bourbon Busset (1912–2001)
 Armand Robin (1912–1961)
 Claude Simon (1913–2005)
 Luc Dietrich (1913–1944)
 Albert Camus (1913–1960)
 Mouloud Feraoun (1913–1962)
 Gilbert Cesbron (1913–1979)
 Armand Lanoux (1913–1983)
 Pierre Daninos (1913–2005)
 Aimé Césaire (1913–2008)
 Félicien Marceau (Louis Carette)(1913–2012)
 Romain Gary (Romain Kacew a/k/a Romain Gary a/k/a Emile Ajar) (1914–1980)
 Béatrix Beck (1914–2008)
 Marguerite Duras (Marguerite Donnadieu) (1914–1996)
Ahmed Sefrioui (1915–2004)
 Roland Barthes (1915–1980)
 Suzanne Césaire (1915–1966)
 Louis Dollot (1915–1997)
 Joseph Zobel (1915–2006)
 Virgil Gheorghiu (1916–1992)
 Jean-Louis Curtis (Louis Laffitte) (1917–1995)
 Ambroise Yxemerry (1917–2013)
 Pierre Bettencourt (1917–2006)
 Alain Guy (1918–1998)
 Maurice Druon (1918–2009)
 Michel Quoist (1918–1997)
 Jean Venturini (1919–1940)
 Alain Bosquet (Anatole Bisk) (1919–1998)
 Jacques Laurent a/k/a Jacques Laurent-Cely or Cécil Saint-Laurent (1919–2000)
 Michel Déon (1919–2016)
 Robert Pinget (1919–1997)

1920–1929
 Jean Dutourd (1920–2011)
 Jean Lartéguy (1920–2011)
 Jean Madiran (1920–2013)
 Mohammed Dib (1920–2003)
 Boris Vian (1920–1959)
 Françoise d'Eaubonne (1920–2005)
 Albert Memmi (1920–2020)
 Georges Brassens (1921–1981)
 Gérald Neveu (1921–1960)
 André Rogerie (1921–2014)
 Michel Guiomar (1921–2013)
 Jean-Pierre Renouard (1922–2014)
 Antoine Blondin (1922–1990)
 Jean-Charles (1922–2003)
 Jean-Claude Renard (1922–2002)
 Stefan Wul (1922–2003)
 Alain Robbe-Grillet (1922–2008)
 Yves Bonnefoy (1923–2016)
 Roger Foulon (1923–2008)
 Georges Perros (1923–1978)
 Ousmane Sembène (1923–2007)
 Jean Dumont (1923–2001)
 Claude Paillat (1924–2001)
 André du Bouchet (1924–2003)
 Salvat Etchart (1924–1985)
 Michel Tournier (1924–2016)
 Philippe Jaccottet (1925–2021)
 Roger Nimier (1925–1962)
 Jean d'Ormesson (1925–2017)
 François Augiéras (1925–1971)
 Alphonse Boudard (1925–2000)
 Roger Giroux (1925–1973)
 Frantz Fanon (1925–1961)
 Jean Robieux (1925–2012)
 Robert Misrahi (1926–...)
 Yvon Taillandier (1926–2018)
 Michel Foucault (1926–1984)
 Michel Butor (1926–2016)
 Jacques Dupin (1927–2012)
 Gisèle Halimi (1927–2020)
 François Nourissier (1927–2011)
 Robert Fossier (1927–2012)
 Renada-Laura Portet (1927-2021)
 Jacques Rivette (1928–2016)
 André Schwarz-Bart (1928–2006)
 Édouard Glissant (1928–2011)
 Kateb Yacine (1929–1989)
 Nicolas Bouvier (1929–1998)

1930–1939

 Jacques Lafaye (1930–...)
 Maggi Lidchi-Grassi (1930–...)
 Françoise Mallet-Joris (1930–2016)
 Jacques Ehrmann (1931–1972)
 Fernando Arrabal (1932–...)
 Mongo Beti (1932–2001)
 Hédi Bouraoui (1932–...)
 Claude Pujade-Renaud (1932–...)
 Jacques Roubaud (1932–...)
 Julienne Salvat (1932–2019)
 Marcelin Pleynet (1933–...)
 Claude Esteban (1935–2006)
 Agota Kristof (1935–2011)
 Françoise Sagan (Françoise Quoirez) (1935–2004)
 Daniel Zimmermann (1935–2000)
 Assia Djebar (1936–2015)
 Frankétienne (1936–...)
 Jean-Edern Hallier (1936–1997)
 Georges Perec (1936–1982)
 Philippe Sollers (1936–...)
 Alain Grée (1936–...)
 Anne-Marie Albiach (1937–2012)
 Marc Alyn (1937–...)
 Pierre Billon (1937–...)
 Andrée Brunin (1937–1993)
 Hélène Cixous (1937–...)
 Maryse Condé (1937–...)
 Abdelkebir Khatibi (1938–2009)
 Daniel Oster (1938–1999)
 Sandra Jayat (c.1939–...)
 Michèle Lesbre (1939–...)
 Kenizé Mourad (1939–...)
 Gérard Roubichou (1939–...)

1940–1949

 Annie Ernaux (1940–...)
 Marie-Reine de Jaham (1940-...)
 J.M.G. Le Clézio (1940–...)
 Emmanuel Hocquard (1940–2019)
 Charles Duchaussois (1940–1991)
 Bernard Brizay (1941–...)
 Louis Mélennec (1941–...)
 Jean Daive (1941–...)
 Julia Kristeva (1941–...)
 Jean Marcel (1941–...)
 François Weyergans (1941–2019)
 Josaphat-Robert Large (1942–2017)
 François-Xavier Guerra (1942–2002)
 Wladimir Troubetzkoy (1942–2009)
 Jean Bernabé (1942–2017)
 Jean-Patrick Manchette (1942-1995)
 Guy Olivier Faure (1943–...)
 Yves Manglou (1943–...)
 Eva Joly (1943–...)
 René-Louis Baron (1944–...)
 Noëlle Châtelet (1944–...)
 Doumbi Fakoly (1944–...)
 Jean-Jacques Greif (1944–...)
 Sergio Kokis (1944–...)
 Daniel Pennac (1944–...)
 Lucien Polastron (1944–...)
 Marc Filloux (1944–1974)
 Alain Guillerm (1944–2005)
 Françoise Chandernagor (1945–...)
 Tony Duvert (1945–2008)
 Pierre Michon (1945–...)
 Gisèle Bienne (1946–...)
 Renaud Camus (1946–...)
 Djémil Kessous (1946–...)
 Tahar Ben Jelloun (1947–...)
 Daniel Maximin (1947-...)
 Luc Perino (1947–...)
 Michel Étiévent (1947–...)
 Loïc Le Ribault (1947–2007)
 Élisabeth Vonarburg (1947–...)
 Jean-Pierre Poccioni (1948–...)
 André Rouillé (1948–...)
 Bertrand Le Gendre (1948–...)
 Jean-Paul Goux (1948–...)
 Serge Duigou (1948–...)
 François Leperlier (1949–...)
 Amin Maalouf (1949–...)
 Didier Daeninckx (1949–...)
 Pierre Bergounioux (1949–...)
 Boualem Sansal (1949–...)

1950–present

 Bernard Bonnejean (1950–...)
 Yolande Cohen (1950–...)
 Jean-Paul Dubois (1950–...)
 Moussa Konaté (1951–2013)
 Salim Jay  (1951–...)
 Bernard Cottret (1951–2020)
 Jean-Didier Urbain (1951–...)
 Raphaël Confiant (1951–...)
 Pierre-Henri Bunel (1952–...)
 Dan Franck (1952–...)
 Dany Laferrière (1953–...)
 Françoise Bettencourt Meyers (1953–...)
 Nancy Huston (1953–...)
 Patrick Chamoiseau (1953–...)
 François Bon (1953–...)
 Édouard Brasey (1954–...)
 Paul Dirmeikis (1954–...)
 Tahar Djaout (1954–1993)
 Margaret Maruani (1954–...)
 Dai Sijie (1954–...)
 Pascale Roze (1954–...)
 Adelina Yzac (1954–...)
 Jean-Pierre Vallotton (1955–...)
 Alexandra Lapierre (1955–...)
 Caroline Lamarche (1955–...)
 Bertrand Renard (1955–...)
 Joël Henry (journalist) (1955–...)
 Renaud Girard (1955–...)
 Annie Pietri (1956–...)
 Charles Mopsik (1956–2003)
 Gisèle Pineau (1956–...)
 Jean-Pierre Thiollet (1956–...)
 Khal Torabully (1956–...)
 Hervé Le Tellier (1957–...)
 Youssef Rzouga (1957–...)
 Jean-Philippe Toussaint (1957–...)
 Azouz Begag (1957–...)
 Didier Ottinger (1957–...)
 Olivier Da Lage (1957–...)
 Simon Basinger (1957–...)
 Michel Houellebecq (1958–...)
 Pierre Leroux (1958-...)
 Marc-Édouard Nabe (1958–...)
 Olivier Weber (1958–...)
 Denis Robert (1958–...)
 Benjamin Sehene (1959–...)
 Christine Angot (1959–...)
 Frédéric-Yves Jeannet (1959–...)
 Jean-Luc Bitton (1959–...)
 Malek Belarbi (1959–...)
 Nicolas Fiévé (1959–...)
 Bruno Laurioux (1959–...)
 Jacques Bonjawo (1960–...)
 Éric-Emmanuel Schmitt (1960–...)
 Simonetta Greggio (1961–...)
 Bernard Werber (1961–...)
 Charles Dantzig (1961–...)
 Philippe Buc (1961–...)
 Valérie Grumelin-Halimi (1961–...)
 Philippe Claudel (1962–...)
Catherine Cusset (1963–...)
 Beatrice Hammer (1963–...)
 Kevin Bokeili (1963–2014)
 Alexis Jenni (1963–...)
 Bill GB Pallot (1964–...)
 Ann Scott (1965–...)
 Stéphane Laurent (1966–...)
 Odile Benyahia-Kouider (1966–...)
 Alain Mabanckou (1966–...)
 Delphine Gardey (1967–...)
 Paul-Louis Roubert (1967–...)
 Jonathan Littell (1967–...)
 Amélie Nothomb (1967–...)
 Fréderic Neyrat (1968–...)
 Norbert-Bertrand Barbe (1968–...)
 Kim Thúy (1968–...)
 Virginie Despentes (1969–...)
 Louis Emond (1969–...)
 Antoine Bello (1970–...)
 Christophe Honoré (1970–...)
 Fabienne Kanor (1970–...)
 Édouard Tétreau (1970–...)
 Philippe Boisnard (1971–...)
 Yannick Mireur (1971–...)
 Angela Behelle (1971–...)
 Nicolas Ancion (1971–...)
 Luis de Miranda (1971–...)
 Cristina Rodríguez (1972–...)
 Kilien Stengel (1972–...)
 Roland Michel Tremblay (1972–...)
 Romain Sardou (1974–...)
 Guillaume Musso (1974–...)
 Olivier Adam (1974–...)
 Benoît Bringer (1979–...)
 Agnès Martin-Lugand (1979–...)
 Diane Mazloum (1980–...)
 Jérémy Marie (1984–...)
 Benjamin Hoffmann (1985–...)
 Oriane Lassus (1987–...)
 Charles Luylier (1989–...)
 Blandine Rinkel (1991-…)
 Soraya Nini (1993–...)
 Estelle Beauchamp (novelist since 1995)

See also

 List of French women writers
 French literature
 Francophone literature
 Lists of French language poets, French novelists, French people, authors
 Quebec literature
 List of Quebec authors
 List of Belgian women writers

 
French language
 Authors